Nikolai Nachev (born 7 February 20, 1955) is a Bulgarian sprint canoer who competed in the mid-1970s. He finished seventh in K-4 1000 m event at the 1976 Summer Olympics in Montreal.

References
Sports-Reference.com profile

1955 births
Bulgarian male canoeists
Canoeists at the 1976 Summer Olympics
Living people
Olympic canoeists of Bulgaria
Place of birth missing (living people)